Lawrence Joseph Steinbach (December 23, 1900 – June 29, 1967) was an American football tackle who played four seasons in the National Football League with the Chicago Bears, Chicago Cardinals and Philadelphia Eagles. He played college football at the University of St. Thomas. He first enrolled at New Rockford High School in New Rockford, North Dakota before transferring to St. Thomas Academy in Mendota Heights, Minnesota.

References

External links
Just Sports Stats

1900 births
1967 deaths
Players of American football from North Dakota
American football tackles
St. Thomas (Minnesota) Tommies football players
Chicago Bears players
Chicago Cardinals players
Philadelphia Eagles players
People from Eddy County, North Dakota